Franz Mortensen (born 16 February 1964) is a Danish freestyle swimmer. He competed at the 1984, 1988 and the 1992 Summer Olympics.

References

External links
 

1964 births
Living people
Danish male freestyle swimmers
Olympic swimmers of Denmark
Swimmers at the 1984 Summer Olympics
Swimmers at the 1988 Summer Olympics
Swimmers at the 1992 Summer Olympics
Swimmers from Copenhagen